Dichomeris strictella is a moth in the family Gelechiidae. It was described by Kyu-Tek Park in 1994. It is found in Korea.

References

Moths described in 1994
strictella